Maibritt Saerens (born 25 May 1970 in Silkeborg, Denmark) is a Danish actress. Her breakthrough was in the role as Søs in the TV series Better Times.

Saerens played in the 2015 TV series The Heavy Water War, appeared as Stella Shearwood in 2014 “Death of a Family Man” S4:E4 of Vera, and had a starring role in the 2010 Norwegian movie Happy, Happy.

External links
 

1970 births
Living people
21st-century Danish actresses
People from Silkeborg
Danish television actresses